Francis Patrick O'Brien (11 February 1911 – 22 October 1991) was a New Zealand cricketer who played first-class cricket for Canterbury from 1932 to 1946 and for Northamptonshire in 1938 and 1939. 

A hard-hitting, tall and elegant middle-order batsman, O'Brien was one of three New Zealanders in the Northamptonshire team in 1938 and 1939, alongside Ken James and Bill Merritt, but he was unable to carry his New Zealand form into county cricket, scoring only 1306 runs in 40 matches. In 1940–41, when Canterbury needed to score 303 in 160 minutes to beat Otago, O'Brien made 101 and added 210 for the second wicket in 82 minutes with Walter Hadlee, and Canterbury won, scoring the required runs in 35 overs. In an innings victory over Otago in 1943-44 he scored 164 in four hours.

References

External links
 

1911 births
1991 deaths
Cricketers from Christchurch
New Zealand cricketers
Canterbury cricketers
Northamptonshire cricketers